Les Respectables is a Canadian rock band that was founded in Quebec City in 1991.

Biography

Origin

1992-1998
In 1992, Les Respectables won first place in a competition run by Montreal radio station, CHOM-FM, and the band also reached the grand final of Yamaha Music's "Sunfest" held in Gimli, Manitoba, Canada. Les Respectables subsequently released their first album, entitled No Dogs, No Band, in 1993. Despite an exhausting promotional tour, the success of the album remains modest. The group made a resurgence in 1997 with Full Regalia, a second full-length effort that was considered more mature, with a greater degree of nuance present in the songwriting.

1999
In 1999, the band released its first album with the Record  label, : Les Disques Passeport, $ = happiness (also known by its French title, "$ = bonheur"). The first single release from the album, "L'homme 7 Up", gained the band a considerable level of attention and the 7 Up company eventually purchased the rights to the song for advertising purposes. Subsequent single releases, "Amalgame" and "Holà" received heavy rotation on commercial radio that carried over into the next decade. The band then completed a tour of Quebec and a third single release, "Money Is Happiness", reached the top placement in the music charts and remained in this position for over two months.

2000-2006
In this time period the band received various awards and tackled the production of a fourth album, Quadrosonic, produced in collaboration with Gordie Johnson, former member of the Canadian band Big Sugar.  In January 2003, opening for the Rolling Stones at the Bell Centre in Montreal, Les Respectables played a well-received set.

2007
On May 23, 2007, the band celebrated 15 years with the release of the DVD, Les Respectables 15th Anniversary, Live at the Bell Center. Over 5,000 copies were sold. Les Respectables played on stage at the Salle Wilfrid-Pelletier Center of Arts, along with the Montreal Symphony Orchestra, while providing another memorable performance.

2008-2009
The group continued to go on tour in Quebec. In 2009 The Great Sweet Mama, the band's new album, was produced and co-written by Gordie Johnson, "Big Sugar"’s former front man. It was their first English album in ten years. Keyboardist, Ian McLagan (The Rolling Stones, The Faces), also lent his talent on several songs. The Great Sweet Mama was recorded in part at Willie Nelson’s Pedernales Studios in Texas, US, and Mixart Studios in Montreal.

Discography

Albums

Singles
 "Sugar" feat. Gordie Johnson – 2009
 "Sweet Mama" - 2009
 "Cette fille" - 2014

References

External links

 The Respectables

Musical groups established in 1991
Musical groups from Quebec City
Canadian rock music groups
1991 establishments in Quebec